Cameo is a cultivar of apple, discovered by chance by the Caudle family in a  Dryden, Washington orchard in 1987. Its parentage is uncertain; it may be a cross between 'Red Delicious' and 'Golden Delicious', since it was found near orchards of those fruits; it also appears similar to the original 'Delicious' cultivar. It is bright red striped over creamy orange, firm and crisp with an aromatic flavor. It is among the top nine most grown apples in Washington state.

References

American apples
Apple cultivars
Apple production in Washington (state)
Chelan County, Washington